Fieldy's Dreams is a rap project by Korn bassist Reginald "Fieldy" Arvizu, active from 2000 to 2002. His first album, the gangsta rap album Rock'n Roll Gangster, was released on January 22, 2002. Most of the lyrics and music were by Fieldy himself, with Polar Bear (of Infinite Mass) helping out with the rest.

Fieldy renamed his project Fieldy's Nightmare and was due to release a 2008 album, Sobriety, but recording was put on hold to focus on work with Korn. Fieldy said that the new album would not be gangsta rap but a bass instrumental album with a funk/jazz fusion.

The Fieldy's Dreams song "Baby Hugh Hef" placed tenth on a list of the "50 Worst Songs of the '00s" in a 2009 Village Voice article.

References

American hip hop groups
Korn solo projects